Sigmund Werner Paul Jähn (13 February 1937 – 21 September 2019) was a German cosmonaut and pilot who in 1978 became the first German to fly into space as part of the Soviet Union's Interkosmos programme.

Early life
Jähn was born on 13 February 1937 in Morgenröthe-Rautenkranz, in the Vogtland region of Saxony, Germany. From 1943 to 1951 he attended school in his hometown. He trained as a printer until 1954 and then managed the pioneer program in a local school.

On 26 April 1955 he joined the East German Air Force, where he became a pilot. From 1961 to 1963 he was deputy commander for political work as an adamant socialist and in 1965 became responsible for air tactics and air shooting. From 1966 to 1970 he studied at the Gagarin Air Force Academy in Monino, in the Soviet Union. From 1970 to 1976, he worked in the administration of the East German Air Force, responsible for pilot education and flight safety.

Jähn (via his father's stories and memorabilia) and his father were impressed by the early rocketry pioneers of the 1920s around Fritz von Opel and the first manned rockets on land and in the air, igniting his enthusiasm for aviation, rocketry and spaceflight.

Space career 
On 25 November 1976, Jähn and his backup Eberhard Köllner were selected for the Interkosmos program. After a brief period of basic training, they devoted a year to mission-specific training. He trained in Star City near Moscow. He flew on board Soyuz 31, launched 26 August 1978 to the Soviet space station Salyut 6, where he conducted experiments in remote sensing of the Earth, medicine, biology, materials science, and geophysics. After 124 orbits he returned on Soyuz 29 and landed on 3 September 1978, having spent 7 days, 20 hours, and 49 minutes in space. Because the Soviet and American space programs maintained distinct vocabularies, he was referred to as a cosmonaut rather than an astronaut.

During and after the flight, the socialist authorities of the GDR acclaimed him as "the first German in space", emphasizing an East German victory over West Germany. State shipping company DSR named a cargo vessel in his honour: Fliegerkosmonaut der DDR Sigmund Jähn.

Upon his return he headed the East Germany Army's Cosmonaut Training Center near Moscow until German unification in 1990, when he left the East German military with the rank of major general. Jähn was awarded the title Hero of the Soviet Union on 3 September 1978. In 1983 he received a doctorate at the Zentralinstitut für Physik der Erde in Potsdam, specialising in remote sensing of the Earth. He was instrumental in forming the Association of Space Explorers. He was a founding member in 1985 and served for several years on its Executive Committee.

After space 
Starting in 1990, after Germany was reunited, he worked as a freelance consultant for the German Aerospace Center and from 1993 also for the European Space Agency (ESA) to prepare for the Euromir missions. He retired in 2002. In 2011, on the 50th anniversary of the first human space flight by Yuri Gagarin, he explained to Der Spiegel that his taking a toy figure on his flight was not a personal choice. Because he and fellow cosmonaut Vladimir Kovalyonok joked about  marrying another toy figure of the Russia mascot Masha, authorities found the material unsuitable for the public. Both were initially threatened with prison, but the matter was subsequently dropped.

Personal life 
Jähn was married and had two children. He lived in Strausberg in the later part of his life and enjoyed reading and hunting. He died on 21 September 2019 at age 82.

Awards and recognition

 Meritorious Military Pilot of the German Democratic Republic
 Hero of the German Democratic Republic
 Hero of the Soviet Union
 Order of Karl Marx
 Order of Lenin
  (only recipient)

 Asteroid 17737 was named "Sigmundjähn" in 2001.
 In 2011, he was made an honorary member of the Leibniz Society of Berlin.

Quotes 
 "Dear TV viewers in the German Democratic Republic. I am very happy for the chance to be the first German to take part in this manned space flight." (during his space flight)

 "…what I saw then was total happiness: Our Earth, shining in bright blue. Just like a dream." (SUPERillu magazine interview, 1998)
 "As a pilot I just could not resist the offer to fly a space capsule…" (speech in front of DLR audience, 2005)

Cultural influence
 Schools, preschools and ships were named after Jähn.
In the 2003 German film Good Bye, Lenin!, cosmonaut Jähn is the boyhood hero of the film's protagonist, Alex Kerner.  As part of an effort to prevent his mother from learning that the Berlin Wall came down while she was in a coma and that East Germany no longer exists as a separate nation, Kerner locates a taxi driver (played by Swiss actor Stefan Walz), who resembles the cosmonaut, to appear in a fake newscast as the successor of Communist Party Secretary Erich Honecker. "Comrade Jähn" gives a speech proclaiming that he will open the East German borders to welcome West German refugees.
 The German pop group Die Prinzen, from the same region of Germany, recorded a song entitled "Wer ist Sigmund Jähn?" ("Who is Sigmund Jähn?") on their 1999 album So viel Spaß für wenig Geld.

Literature
 Sigmund Jähn: Erlebnis Weltraum, Militärverlag der DDR, Berlin 1985.
 Horst Hoffmann: Sigmund Jähn. Der fliegende Vogtländer. Das Neue Berlin, Berlin 1999, (biography).
 Horst Hoffmann: Die Deutschen im Weltraum. Zur Geschichte der Kosmosforschung und Raumfahrt in der DDR. Vorwort von Sigmund Jähn, Edition Ost, 1998, .
 Horst Hoffmann: Sigmund Jähn. Rückblick ins All: Die Biografie des ersten deutschen Kosmonauten. Das Neue Berlin, 2. Auflage, Berlin 2008, .

References

External links 

 Spacefacts biography of Sigmund Jähn
 Encyclopædia Britannica

1937 births
2019 deaths
People from Vogtlandkreis
People from Strausberg
Major generals of the Air Forces of the National People's Army
Socialist Unity Party of Germany members
German astronauts
Foreign Heroes of the Soviet Union
Recipients of the Order of Lenin
Salyut program cosmonauts